Crassispira trimariana is a species of sea snail, a marine gastropod mollusk in the family Pseudomelatomidae.

Description
The length of the shell attains 11 mm, its diameter 4 mm.

Distribution
This marine species occurs off the Tres Marias Islands, Pacific Mexico.

References

 H. A. Pilsbry and H. N. Lowe, West Mexican and Central American Mollusks Collected by H. N. Lowe, 1929-31; Proceedings of the Academy of Natural Sciences of Philadelphia Vol. 84 (1932), pp. 33-144

External links
 
 

trimariana
Gastropods described in 1932